Franzo Grande Stevens (born 13 September 1928) is an Italian lawyer. Grande Stevens is famous for being the lawyer of the Agnelli family, and he was one of the triad of longtime advisors of Gianni Agnelli. He continues to advise his grandson and heir John Elkann. He served as chairman of Juventus F.C. from 2003 to 2006.

Early life 
Born in Naples, he is the grandson of tycoon Franzo Grande. Of Anglo-Sicilian-Neapolitan origin, one branch of the family is from Avola, while the other is English, and to this he owes the second part of the surname.

Career 
Enrolled in the Register of Lawyers since 1954, Grande Stevens became one of Agnelli's trusted persons; he was vice-chairman of Fiat, the company owned by Agnelli. Like  before him, he was nicknamed "the lawyer's lawyer". In 1976, he participated as public defender in the trial of the historical leaders of the Red Brigades, together with the president of the council of the Turin bar association, Fulvio Croce, who was later assassinated by the Red Brigades. He wrote Vita d'un avvocato, published by Cedam in 2000, more than twenty years after the murder of Croce, about the affair.

Over time, Grande Stevens followed the corporate events of the most important industrial groups in the country, often holding managerial positions within them. Among his clients were the likes of Carlo De Benedetti, Luigi Giribaldi, Aga Khan IV, and Adriana Volpe, and companies like Ferrero, Pininfarina, and Lavazza.

Juventus F.C. 
In August 2003, Grande Stevens succeeded Caissotti di Chiusano, who had died on 31 July 2003, as chairman of the board of directors of Juventus F.C., the Agnelli family-owned association football club in Turin. Grande Stevens held the position until he was replaced by Giovanni Cobolli Gigli, amid the Calciopoli scandal, in 2006; he was made honorary chairman of the club including former Juventus player Giampiero Boniperti. As of the 2022–23 Juventus F.C. season, he remains one of the club's honorary chairmen.

His role in the aftermath of Calciopoli is questioned. The scandal itself remains a much-debated topic due to the one-side focus on Juventus and its harsh, unprecedented punishment. Some observers allege that Calciopoli and its aftermath were also a dispute within Juventus and between the club's owners, including Grande Stevens and Gianluigi Gabetti who favoured John Elkann over Andrea Agnelli as chairman, and wanted to get rid of Luciano Moggi, Antonio Giraudo, and Roberto Bettega, whose shares in the club increased. Whatever their intentions, it is argued they condemned Juventus, firstly when Carlo Zaccone, the club's lawyer, agreed for relegation to Serie B and point-deduction, and secondly when Luca Cordero di Montezemolo retired the club's appeal to the Regional Administrative Court (TAR) of Lazio, which could have cleared the club's name and avoid relegation, after FIFA threatened to suspend the Italian Football Federation (FIGC) from international play; then FIFA president Sepp Blatter personally thanked Montezemolo. As a company, Juventus were acquitted in the Calciopoli trials.

Exor 
In 2009, Grande Stevens was prosecuted for market manipulation in the equity swap of IFI–IFIL that is now Exor, Agnelli's holding company and Fiat's financial company. The trial, which began on 26 March 2009, saw him involved for the equity swap of IFI–IFIL and Exor that in 2005 allowed the Agnelli heirs to maintain control of Fiat; according to the prosecution, this was kept hidden for many months to the Consob and the market. According to the Turin investigating judge, Francesco Moroni, Grande Stevens had to answer for information rigging, or microcap stock fraud. Also involved in the investigation were the then IFIL president Gianluigi Gabetti and managing director Virgilio Marrone; all three defendants were acquitted on 21 December 2010. On 21 February 2013, in the appeal process, Grande Stevens was sentenced to 1 year and 4 months, after Italy's Supreme Court of Cassation annulled the acquittal. On 17 December 2013, the Court of Cassation annulled the sentence without a remand to a new court due to the statute of limitations.

In 2011, Grande Stevens was influential in encouraging Exor CEO John Elkann to move Exor's headquarters from Turin to Hong Kong. Exor, the business group is expanding further into the global market and Hong Kong is one of the most important hubs of international finance and the main access route to the Asian market.

Personal life 
Married since 1954, he has a son, Riccardo Grande Stevens. In 2018, he described himself as "a Turinese from Naples", and said he can speak the Piedmontese language. Grande Stevens was a personal friend of Sergio Marchionne, who was CEO of Fiat Chrysler Automobiles, and whom he described as having a father–son relationship. When Marchionne died in 2018, there were talks of a shoulder surgery but many had assumed that lung cancer was behind his death, including Grande Stevens, who wrote a letter in the Corriere della Sera. He said: "When I learned from London TV that he had been hospitalized in Zurich, I unfortunately thought that his life was in danger. Because I knew his inability to escape the constant smoke of cigarettes. However, when I learned it was just shoulder surgery, I hoped. Instead, as I feared, from Zurich I received confirmation that his lungs had been attacked and I understood that he was near the end."

Honours 
  Knight Grand Cross of the Order of Merit of the Italian Republic, 27 January 1990.

Explanatory notes

References

External links 

 Franzo Grande Steves at Ordine Avvocati Torino 
 Grande Stevens lawyer office official website at GrandeStevens.it 
 I novant'anni di Franzo Grande Stevens at Juventus.com 
 Museo Nazionale del Risorgimento Italiano of which he is honorary chairman 
 Grande Stevens sentence at Eurojus.it 
 Grande Stevens sentece at the HUDOC database 
 Grande Stevens sentence at Sistema Penale 

1928 births
20th-century Italian lawyers
Italian football chairmen and investors
Juventus F.C. chairmen and investors
Juventus F.C. directors
Living people
People from Avola
University of Naples Federico II alumni